Putra Komuter station is a Malaysian commuter train halt in Kuala Lumpur. It is named in part after Putra World Trade Centre located nearby, which is now known as the World Trade Centre Kuala Lumpur. World Trade Centre Kuala Lumpur is one of the convention and exhibition centres located in Kuala Lumpur.

The halt forms part of a common KTM Komuter railway line shared by both the Port Klang Line and the Seremban Line. The halt is also the northernmost station in the KTM Komuter network where trains from both lines stop.

History
During British colonial rule, there existed a halt known as Maxwell Road Halt on this site, named after nearby Maxwell Road (Jalan Tun Ismail).

The halt was re-built during the double tracking and electrification of railway lines in Kuala Lumpur, Selangor and Negeri Sembilan between 1990 and 1994 to primarily serve KTM Komuter services.  Since beginning operation with the launch of KTM Komuter in 1995, the halt has remained relatively unchanged in both its position in the railway system and station design. In mid-2007 the halt underwent one significant upgrade.

Design
The Putra stop has two side platforms at either side of two electrified railway tracks. Because of its specific use as a Komuter stop, Putra station is merely a designated halt with a single two-room building housing limited staff members, and originally designed to offer only ticketing services, including both manual and ticket vending machines, and fare gates. A footbridge was included to link both platforms. Due to its location close to a major roadway (Jalan Kuching), the halt also features one unusually narrow platform. The halt underwent upgrading of a platform canopy in mid-2007.

Transport connections
The halt is located 400–500 m from the  PWTC LRT station on the Ampang and Sri Petaling Lines of the Rapid Rail Light Rapid Transit (LRT). Although not marked as an interchange on older transit maps, walking between the two stations is possible through an overhead pedestrian bridge across Jalan Kuching.

The former Putra Bus Terminal (closed on 1 December 2014), which served buses to Peninsular Malaysia's East Coast destinations, was 300 m away.

References

Rawang-Seremban Line
Railway stations in Kuala Lumpur
Port Klang Line